The HR is a family of straight-3 12-valve and straight-4 16-valve automobile engines with continuously variable valve timing, involving development by Nissan (Aichi Kikai) and/or Renault, and also Mercedes-Benz in the case of the H5Ht/M282. The designation of H engine is used by Renault, and M28x by Mercedes-Benz, to classify the family.

78 mm series
 No Daimler involvement
 three- and four-cylinder layouts, multi point fuel injection except HR12DDR and HR14DDe with direct fuel injection
 most engines naturally aspirated with few exceptions being supercharged or turbocharged
 introduced in 2002 on Nissan Cube Z11

HR10DE
The HR10DE is a  naturally aspirated straight-three engine. Bore: ; Stroke ; 12v DOHC. Flex-Fuel, gasoline (E22) or ethanol (E100). Compression ratio of 11.2:1.

It is fitted to the following vehicles:
2015 Nissan March K13 (Brazil)
2015 Nissan Versa N17 (Brazil)

HR12DE

The HR12DE is a  naturally aspirated straight-three engine. Bore: ; Stroke ; 12-valve DOHC; EFI with variable valve timing.

It is fitted to the following vehicles:
2010 Nissan Micra
2010 Nissan Almera (Thailand)
2012 Nissan Note
2014 Datsun Go/Datsun Go+
2019 Datsun Go/Datsun Go+ CVT
2018 Nissan Serena e-Power (Japan)
2020 Nissan Kicks e-Power
2021 Nissan Sylphy e-Power (China)
2021 Nissan Note e-power

HR14DET (Renault H4Jt) 
1397 cc, 96 kW (130 PS) at 5500 rpm, 190 Nm at 2250 rpm. Bore: ; Stroke .
 2009–2013 Renault Mégane III
 2009–2013 Renault Scénic III

HR14DDe 
The HR14DDe is a  naturally aspirated straight-3 engine. Bore: ; Stroke ; 12v DOHC; direct injection with variable valve timing. Purposely, this engine is only built as a power generator for the electric motor.
 2022–present Nissan Serena e-Power

HR15DE (Renault H4K) 

The HR15DE is a  naturally aspirated straight-4 engine. Bore: ; Stroke ; 16 valve DOHC; EFI with variable valve timing.
 2002–2020 Nissan Cube Z11/12
 2004–2012 Nissan Note E11
 2004–2012 Nissan Tiida C11
 2005–2012 Nissan Bluebird Sylphy G11
 2005–present Nissan Micra/March K12/13/14
 2006–present Nissan NV150 AD Van/Wingroad NY12
 2006–2019 Nissan Livina/Grand Livina L10/11
 2007–2019 Mitsubishi Lancer Cargo/Mazda Familia Van NY12 (Japan)
 2009–2018 Nissan Evalia (Indonesia)
 2010–2019 Nissan Juke F15 (Japan and Indonesia)
 2011–present Nissan Almera/Latio/Sunny N17/18
 2012–2017 Renault Scala N17
 2015–present Dacia/Renault Duster HS
 2016–present Nissan Kicks P15 (Global)
2016–present Renault Captur/Kaptur GA
 2019–present Nissan Kicks D15 (India)

HR16DE (Renault H4M) 

The HR16DE is a  naturally aspirated gasoline straight-4 engine, 16 valve DOHC; EFI; with variable valve timing. This engine has two fuel injectors per cylinder to improve fuel economy and reduce emissions. Bore: ; Stroke .
It is fitted to the following vehicles:

 2002–2020 Nissan Cube Z11, Z12
 2004 Nissan Note/Versa Note E11, E12
 2004 Nissan Versa/Tiida C11
 2005–2018 Nissan Bluebird Sylphy G11
 2005 Nissan Micra/March K12, K13, K14
 2005 Nissan AD Van/Wingroad NY12
 2006–2013 Nissan Qashqai J10/NJ10
 2006–2019 Nissan Livina/Grand Livina L10, L11
 2008 Renault Mégane MK3
 2009–2019 Nissan NV200, also rebadged as Mitsubishi Delica D:3
 2010 Nissan Juke F15 (Japan)
 2011 Nissan Sunny/Latio N17
 2012 Nissan Sylphy/Sentra B17, B18 
2012–Present Nissan Versa/Almera (Americas) N17, N18 
 2015 Dacia Duster HS
 2016 Nissan Kicks P15 (Global), D15 (India)
 2017 Dacia Duster HM
 2019 Lada Vesta
 2019 Lada XRAY
 2020 Nissan Sunny/Almera N18
 2020 Renault Clio MK5 (HEV)
 2020 Renault Mégane MK4 (PHEV)
 2020 Renault Captur MK2 (PHEV)
 2020 Renault Sandero (2020) LATAM
 2021 Renault Arkana E-tech 
 2022 Nissan Juke Hybrid

DE engine updates (2006–present)
Changes include:
neutral idle control achieved through the coordinated control of the engine in tandem with the XTRONIC CVT
introduction of alternator regenerative control mechanism
Reduction of engine friction by machining the cam shaft to a crowning mirror-like finish and application of a fluorine coating to the chain guide
Delayed valve closure timing of the intake, achieved through the increased conversion angle of C-VTC and superior timing management, thus reducing pumping loss when idling
Lower idling speed
The improved HR15DE engines were first used in Nissan Cube, Nissan Cube Cubic, Nissan Note, Nissan Tiida, Nissan Tiida Latio and Nissan Wingroad sold since December 25, 2006.

HR12DDR 

The HR12DDR is a  supercharged straight-3 engine, equipped with timing chain and direct injection. Designed for small-car applications, this gasoline engine incorporates a variety of technologies to minimize  emissions while providing practical levels of power output.

Some of the pertinent features are:
 Compression ratio of 13.0:1
 Continuous Variable Valve Timing Control System (CVTCS)
 Direct Injection Gasoline (DIG)
 Miller cycle
 Supercharged
 Variable capacity oil pump
 Hydrogen-free diamond like carbon(DLC) coated valve lifters and piston rings
 Sodium filled exhaust valves
 High efficiency

It is fitted to the following vehicles:
2010 Nissan Micra
2012 Nissan Note

75.5 mm series 
 three-cylinder layout with direct fuel injection
 introduced in 2022 on Renault cars

HR12DDV (Renault HR12) 
The HR12DDV is a  all-aluminium direct injected and variable geometry turbocharged Miller cycle straight-three engine 48V mHEV equipped with lifetime timing chain, 12v DOHC, VVT, variable displacement oil pump, electric driven water pump, with Bore Spray Coating, Stop-Start and regenerative braking, Bore: , Stroke . Renault marketing names for these engines are TCe130, TCe 150 (on the Grand Austral), E-Tech 160 and E-Tech 200.

It is fitted to the following vehicles:

2022 Renault Austral

72.2 mm series 
 most of the engines were first seen in Renault or Mercedes-Benz cars
 three and four-cylinder layouts with direct fuel injection except HR09DET, HR10DE and HR10DET
 designed specifically for turbocharged application, with thicker cylinder walls than the 78 mm bore variants
 introduced in 2013 on Renault cars

HR12DDT / HRA2 (Renault H5Ft) 
The HR12DDT is a  all-aluminium direct injected and turbocharged straight-four engine equipped with lifetime timing chain, 16v DOHC, VVT, variable displacement oil pump, Stop-Start and regenerative braking, Bore: , Stroke . Renault marketing names for these engines are TCe115, TCe120, TCe125, and TCe130.

It is fitted to the following vehicles:

2013–2018 Renault Captur I
2013–2018 Renault Mégane III + IV
2013–2018 Nissan Qashqai II
2014–2018 Nissan Juke I
2015-2018 Nissan Pulsar
2017–2019 Dacia Duster (HM)

This engine has been plagued by abnormal oil consumption.

HR10DE (Renault H4D) 
The HR10DE is a  multi point injected, naturally aspirated, straight-3 engine.
2014–2019 Renault Twingo SCe 70
2019– Renault Twingo SCe 65
2014–2019 Smart Fortwo and Smart Forfour (as Mercedes-Benz M281 engine)
2017 Nissan Micra K14 1.0, IG 71
2021 Dacia Logan III SCe 65
2021 Dacia Sandero III SCe 65

HR09DET (Renault H4Bt) 
The H4Bt is a  multi point injected, turbocharged, straight-3 engine. A 110hp version was available in the Twingo GT (2016-2018).
2012-2020 Renault Clio TCe 90
2013-2021 Dacia Sandero TCe 90
2013-2021 Dacia Logan TCe 90
2013-2020 Renault Captur TCe 90
2014- Renault Twingo TCe 90/95 and GT (TCe 110)
2014–2019 Smart Fortwo and Smart Forfour (as Mercedes-Benz M281 engine)
2017–2019 Nissan Micra K14 0.9 Turbo, IG-T 90

HR13DDT (Renault H5Ht / Mercedes-Benz M282) 
The HR13DDT is a  all-aluminium direct injected and turbocharged straight-four engine equipped with lifetime timing chain, 16v DOHC, VVT, variable displacement oil pump, Stop-Start, regenerative braking, and Bore Spray Coating system (as installed in Nissan GT-R models), Bore: , Stroke . Renault brands for these engines are TCe115, TCe140 and TCe160. This engine tests WLTP proof (Euro 6c). This engine is also rebranded as a Mercedes-Benz under the name "M282", adding cylinder deactivation technology. It is fitted to the following vehicles:

2018 Mercedes-Benz A-Class
2019 Mercedes-Benz B-Class
2019 Mercedes-Benz CLA-Class
2020 Mercedes-Benz GLA-Class
2020 Mercedes-Benz GLB-Class
2018 Nissan Qashqai II
2018 Renault Mégane IV
2018 Renault Scénic / Grand Scénic IV
2019 Nissan X-Trail III
2019 Renault Arkana (Russia)
2019 Renault Captur I + II
2019 Renault Clio V
2019 Renault Kadjar
2019 Renault Talisman
2020 Dacia Duster II (HM)
2020 Renault Samsung XM3/Renault Arkana/Renault Megane Conquest
2020 Nissan Kicks (India, D15)
2020 Renault Kaptur (Russia)
2020 Renault Koleos II
2021 Nissan Qashqai III
2021 Renault Kangoo III /Nissan Townstar / Mercedes-Benz Citan / Mercedes-Benz T-Class
2022 Renault Austral

HR10DET / HRA0 (Renault H4Dt) 

The HR10DET is a  multi point injected, turbocharged, straight-three engine with a  bore and a  stroke. This engine is also available as a LPG version.

2019 Nissan Almera (N18) 152 Nm
2019 Nissan Micra K14 IG-T 100
2019 Renault Clio V TCe 100
2020 Renault Captur II
2021 Dacia Logan III TCe 90 / ECO-G 100
2021 Dacia Sandero III TCe 90 / ECO-G 100
2021 Nissan Magnite
2021 Renault Kiger TCe
2021 Renault Triber TCe
2022 Dacia Jogger TCe 100 / ECO-G 100

HR10DDT / HRA1 / Renault H5Dt 

The HR10DDT is a  direct injected, turbocharged, straight-3 engine.
2019 Nissan Juke II
2020 Renault Mégane sedan
2022 Dacia Jogger TCe 110
2023 Dacia Sandero Stepway TCe 110

See also
 List of Nissan engines
 List of Renault engines

References

External links
Nissan pages: HR12DDR Engine

HR
HR
Gasoline engines by model
Straight-four engines
Straight-three engines